July Morning is an annual Bulgarian festival, celebrated on the night before and the first day of July. The festival is unique to Bulgaria but it is not universally observed in the country.
 
In the days before the first day of July, people from across Bulgaria travel (often hitchhiking) to the Black Sea coast to meet the first sun rays on the first day of July. People gather around fires, play music and wait for the sunrise. There is no mandatory ritual, ceremony or rite for this tradition and it is up to participants' discretion how they spend the night before July 1st. On many locations, there are concerts with professional and amateur bands. Camping at the locations of choice for the July Morning celebration is also very popular.

Initially, celebrants gathered on Pier 1 in Port of Varna East; now the vigil takes place on beaches as well. In recent years, it has spread to Kamen Bryag, Kavarna, Shkorpilovtsi, Irakli, Burgas, Sozopol, Varvara, Ahtopol, Chernomorets as well as the whole Bulgarian Black Sea coast.

There were many attempts to commercialise the tradition by various parties – municipal authorities, concert promoters, etc. – trying to organise July Morning festivals and specials. All such attempts failed, possibly due to the lack of a single location of celebrations, or commercial organisations failing to condemn some of the celebrations' more "questionable" activities. Most recently, in 2012 some 12,000 people met the sunrise at Kamen Bryag where the song "July Morning" was performed by ex-Uriah Heep's singer John Lawton.

Meaning and significance 
The name of the festival comes from the British rock band Uriah Heep's 1971 hit "July Morning" which became widely popular in Bulgaria in the 1980s and somehow named and remained central to this unique Bulgarian festival.

There are many versions of the meaning of the festival. Most people consider July Morning a celebration of a new beginning and freedom in the spirit of the hippie movement. For others, it is a good reason for a late night/early morning party as July 1 is the first day of summer break for most high schools in Bulgaria and the unofficial start of the summer vacationing season, traditionally culminating with a trip to the Black Sea coast in July or August.

July Morning may be related to sun worship (see also Peter Deunov) and to midsummer night rites popular throughout Bulgarian lands from time immemorial.

History 
The various accounts on the beginnings of July Morning vary widely, mostly depending on the meaning that the teller puts into the tradition.

It is said that July Morning arose as early as 1980 in Varna among young people as a subtle protest against the Communist regime. Even though, there are no records of organised protests there were informal and sporadic marches called 'happening' (Хепънинг). After studying subcultures in Serbia, Macedonia and Bulgaria, Nikola Božilović argues that the subcultural self of adolescents comprises a certain degree of symbolic aggression which serves to challenge authorities, to oppose regulations and to refute social conventions. That is why it is well-grounded to consider rock subcultural identities of the young as identities for resistance. 

Many young people felt attracted to some of the so-called hippie ideals from the 1960s, communicated mainly through rock and pop music of the time. As a country behind the Iron Curtain, Bulgaria did not have a music market similar to the ones in the Western countries and it was not uncommon for albums and tracks by Western artists to become popular years, sometimes decades, after their initial release. This seems to be the case with Uriah Heep's song "July Morning".

References

Bulgarian culture
Hippie movement
July observances
Annual events in Bulgaria
Uriah Heep (band)